Grisham is a surname. Notable people with the surname include:

People
 Charles Grisham, biochemist and professor
 Jack Grisham (born 1961), American rock vocalist, musician, raconteur and political activist
 Jim Grisham (1942–2012), American football player
 John Grisham (born 1955), American novelist
 Michelle Lujan Grisham (born 1959), American lawyer and politician; 32nd Governor of New Mexico
 Reggie Grisham, an American horn player
 Sadie Park Grisham (1859–1928), educator and municipal public office-holder
 Stephanie Grisham (born 1976), American former White House official
 Todd Grisham (born 1976), American sports reporter and presenter
 Trent Grisham (born 1996), American baseball player
 Tyler Grisham (born 1987), American football player
 Wayne R. Grisham (1923–2011), American politician
 Cassie Grisham, contestant on America's Next Top Model (season 3)

Fictional characters
 Kate Grisham, character in the 1997 British science fiction detective TV series Crime Traveller

See also
 Grisham (disambiguation)